2,2,2-Trifluoroethanol is the organic compound with the formula CF3CH2OH.  Also known as TFE or trifluoroethyl alcohol, this colourless, water-miscible liquid has a smell reminiscent of ethanol.  Due to the electronegativity of the trifluoromethyl group, this alcohol exhibits a stronger acidic character compared to ethanol.

Synthesis
Trifluoroethanol is produced industrially by hydrogenation or the hydride reduction of derivatives of trifluoroacetic acid, such as the esters or acyl chloride.

TFE can also be prepared by hydrogenolysis of compounds of generic formula CF3−CHOH−OR (where R is hydrogen or an alkyl group containing from one to eight carbon atoms), in the presence of a palladium containing catalyst deposited on activated charcoal. As a co-catalyst for this conversion tertiary aliphatic amines like triethylamine are commonly employed.

Properties
Trifluoroethanol is used as a specialized solvent in organic chemistry. Oxidations of sulfur compounds using hydrogen peroxide are effectively conducted in TFE.

It competitively inhibits alcohol dehydrogenase for example.

TFE forms complexes with Lewis bases such as THF or pyridine through hydrogen bonding, yielding 1:1 adducts. It is classified as a hard Lewis acid and its acceptor properties are discussed in the ECW model yielding EA = 2.07 and CA = 1.06.

Reactions
Oxidation of trifluoroethanol yields trifluoroacetic acid. It  also serves as a source of the trifluoroethoxy group for various chemical reactions (Still-Gennari modification of HWE reaction).

2,2,2-Trifluoroethyl vinyl ether, an inhaled drug introduced clinically under the tradename Fluoromar, features a vinyl ether of trifluorethanol.  This species was prepared by the reaction of trifluoroethanol with acetylene.

Safety
Trifluoroethanol is classified as toxic to blood, the reproductive system, bladder, brain, upper respiratory tract and eyes. Research has shown it to be a testicular toxicant in rats and dogs.

See also
Trifluoromethanol

References

External links
 Halocarbon Fluorochemicals 
 United States Patent number 4,647,706 "Process for the synthesis of 2,2,2-Trifluoroethanol and 1,1,1,3,3,3-Hexafluoroisopropanol"

Halogenated solvents
Primary alcohols
GABAA receptor positive allosteric modulators
Glycine receptor agonists
Sedatives
Hypnotics
Fluoroethanols
Trifluoromethyl compounds